Trevor Bates (born August 28, 1993) is an American football linebacker who is currently a free agent. He played college football for Maine, and was drafted by the Indianapolis Colts in the seventh round (239th overall) of the 2016 NFL draft. He won Super Bowl LI with the New England Patriots, beating the Atlanta Falcons.

College career
Bates recorded 17 sacks in his final three seasons with the Maine Black Bears. As a junior, he recorded seven pass deflections and three interceptions and was named team MVP.

Professional career

Indianapolis Colts
Bates was drafted in the seventh round (239th overall) of the 2016 NFL draft by the Indianapolis Colts. He signed his rookie contract with the Colts on May 5, 2016. On September 3, 2016, he was waived by the Colts as part of final roster cuts and was signed to the practice squad the next day. He was elevated to the active roster on October 4, 2016 but was released on October 13.

New England Patriots
Bates was signed to the New England Patriots' practice squad on November 7, 2016.

On February 5, 2017, Bates was part of the Patriots team that won Super Bowl LI. In the game, the Patriots defeated the Atlanta Falcons by a score of 34–28 in overtime.

On February 7, 2017, Bates signed a futures contract with the Patriots. He was waived by the Patriots on September 2, 2017 and signed to the practice squad the next day, only to be released two days later.

New York Giants
On October 31, 2017, Bates was signed to the New York Giants' practice squad. He was released on December 11, 2017.

Detroit Lions
On May 23, 2018, Bates signed with the Detroit Lions. He was waived on September 3, 2018 and was re-signed to the practice squad. He was promoted to the active roster on October 15, 2018.

On March 11, 2019, Bates was released by the Lions due to an altercation with the police.

References

External links
 Profile at GoBlackBears.com

1993 births
Living people
People from Westbrook, Maine
Players of American football from Maine
American football linebackers
Maine Black Bears football players
Westbrook High School (Maine) alumni
Indianapolis Colts players
New England Patriots players
New York Giants players
Detroit Lions players